Loes was a hundred of Suffolk, with an area of .

It followed the course of the River Deben from Cretingham to Ufford where it crossed Wilford Hundred to Woodbridge where it widened considerably. The town and port of Woodbridge fell within the hundred but was detached from the main part by about three miles (5 km). Loes was bounded on the east by Plomesgate Hundred, on the north by Hoxne Hundred, and on the west and south west by Thredling, Carlford and Wilford Hundreds.

The area is a picturesque district of hill and valley watered by the Deben, the River Ore and their tributary streams, and the loamy soil is well suited to barley, wheat and beans.

Listed as Losa in the Domesday Book, the name "Loes" probably indicates that it was originally owned by a man named Hlossa.

Parishes

Loes Hundred consisted of the following 18 parishes:

The parishes of Woodbridge and Kenton are in a detached section of the hundred, which also includes small parts of Bredfield and Dallinghoo that are predominantly in Wilford Hundred.

References

Hundreds of Suffolk